Walnut Hills Cemetery is located at 3117 Victory Parkway in the Walnut Hills neighborhood of Cincinnati, Ohio. The cemetery opened in 1843, under the name of "The Second German Protestant Cemetery". Other names include "German Cemetery", "German Protestant Cemetery", and "Walnut Hills Protestant Cemetery". In 1941, at the beginning of World War II, the name was changed to Walnut Hills Cemetery. Major League Baseball player George Rohe (1874–1957) is buried there.

References 

 Cincinnati, a Guide to the Queen City and Its Neighbors, American Guide Series, The Weisen-Hart Press, 1943, p. 313

External links 
 Walnut Hills Cemetery
 
 

Cemeteries in Cincinnati
German-American history